The Kambui Hills and Extensions Forest Reserve is found in Sierra Leone. This site is 143 km².

References

Forest reserves of Sierra Leone